Stenoptilia friedeli is a moth of the family Pterophoridae. It is found in Morocco.

The wingspan is 25 mm. The forewings and hindwings are yellowish-brown.

Etymology
It is named for Georg Friedel.

References

Moths described in 1984
friedeli
Endemic fauna of Morocco
Moths of Africa